Goring railway station may refer to:

Goring & Streatley railway station in Oxfordshire, England
Goring-by-Sea railway station in Sussex, England